The College of Physicians and Surgeons of Alberta (CPSA) is responsible for the registration, regulation, and discipline of physicians in Alberta, Canada.  It was founded in 1906 by an Act of the Legislative Assembly of Alberta.  Its inaugural meeting was October 18, 1906.

Mission & Vision
The College of Physicians and Surgeons of Alberta is led by its mission to protect the public and ensure trust by guiding the medical profession. Its vision is to ensure the highest quality medical care for Albertans through regulatory excellence. CPSA guides and supports physicians in providing competent, compassionate and ethical care to patients in Alberta.

References

External links
College of Physicians and Surgeons of Alberta home page

Medical associations based in Canada
Medical and health organizations based in Alberta
Professional associations based in Alberta
Organizations based in Edmonton